The Deutsche Streicherphilharmonie (DSP) (German String Philharmonic) is a German string youth orchestra, based in Bonn.

History 
The ensemble was founded in 1973 as the selection string orchestra of the music schools of the German Democratic Republic and from 1976 was called the Rundfunk-Musikschulorchester (RMO). With the support of the Federal Government, it was taken over by the Vienna Philharmonic in 1991 and since then has borne the name "Deutsches Musikschulorchester" (DMO). In 2003, it was renamed the "Deutsche Streicherphilharmonie" (German String Philharmonic).

Members 
The German String Philharmonic consists of young people between the ages of 11 and 20 who have qualified for participation in the orchestra through an audition. The ensemble members meet several times a year for rehearsals and concert tours.

Former members now play in renowned orchestras such as the Vienna Philharmonic (concertmaster), the Rundfunk-Sinfonieorchester Berlin, the Sächsische Staatskapelle Dresden and the orchestra of the Metropolitan Opera.

Concerts 
The orchestra performs at venues including the Konzerthaus Berlin, the Berlin Philharmonie, the Gewandhaus in Leipzig, the Alte Oper Frankfurt, the Kölner Philharmonie and the Saalbau Essen. They regularly tour abroad, most recently to Ecuador for their 40th anniversary in 2013.

Concert recordings and studio recordings are regularly produced with Deutschlandradio.

Lecturers 
The artistic work of the Deutsche Streicherphilharmonie is ensured by a music director, Wolfgang Hentrich since 2013, as well as a permanent Dozententeam consisting of members of the Rundfunk-Sinfonieorchester Berlin, which acts as the DSP's sponsor orchestra. In 2014, the lecturers were Bodo Przesdzing (first violin), Karin Kynast (second violin), Claudia Beyer (viola), Volkmar Weiche (violoncello) and Axel Buschmann (double bass).

Repertoire 
The programme includes great works of string orchestra literature from all musical epochs as well as rarities, cabinet pieces and contemporary pieces.

Sponsors 

Music Directors 
 Helmut Koch 1973–1975
 Herbert Kegel 1974–1976
 Wolf-Dieter Hauschild 1976–1984
 Jörg-Peter Weigle 1984–1995
 Hanns-Martin Schneidt 1995–2002 (Honorary conductor)
 Michael Sanderling 2003–2013 (Honorary conductor)
 Wolfgang Hentrich since 2013.

See also 
 List of youth orchestras

References

External links 
 
 

String orchestras
Organisations based in Bonn
1973 establishments in East Germany
German youth orchestras